Novopskov is an urban-type settlement in the Starobilsk Raion of Luhansk Oblast in Ukraine. It is located on the Aidar, a left tributary of the Donets, in the basin of the Don. Population:  Prior to 2020, it was the administrative centre of the former Novopskov Raion.

Economy

Transportation
Bilokurakyne is connected by road with Starobilsk where it has further access to Highway H26 ro Svatove and Bilovodsk, as well as to Highway H21 to Luhansk. However, the section between Shchastia and Luhansk is controlled by the Luhansk People's Republic, and free movement from Shchastia to Luhansk is impossible.

The closest railway station is in Starobilsk, on a railway line which is currently disconnected from the rest of the railway network in Ukraine. To the south, it extends to Kondrashivska Nova, in Stanytsia Luhanska, and to the north it crosses the border to Russia, and further runs to Valuyki.

References

Urban-type settlements in Starobilsk Raion
Starobilsk Raion